Gold Sox can refer to two professional baseball teams:

 The Amarillo Gold Sox, of the American Association.
 The Yuba-Sutter Gold Sox, a wooden bat collegiate summer league team.